Iodine is used to treat and prevent iodine deficiency and as an antiseptic. For iodine deficiency it can be given by mouth or injection into a muscle. As an antiseptic it may be used on wounds that are wet or to disinfect the skin before surgery.

Common side effects when applied to the skin include irritation and discoloration. When taken by mouth or injection side effects may include allergic reactions, goitre, and thyroid dysfunction. Use during pregnancy is recommended in regions where deficiency is common, otherwise it is not recommended. Iodine is an essential trace element.

In 1811, Bernard Courtois isolated iodine from seaweed while in 1820 Jean-Francois Coindet linked iodine intake to goiter size. It initially came into use as a disinfectant and for goiter. It is on the World Health Organization's List of Essential Medicines. Table salt with iodine, known as iodized salt, is available in more than 110 countries.

Society and culture
So wide spread was the importance of iodine in the society that it has mention in policy making, which is indirectly related to public health.

Formulations
A number of iodine containing formulations are also used medically including:

Potassium iodide (supplement)
Lugol’s solution (supplement and disinfectant)
Povidone-iodine (disinfectant)
Iohexol (contrast agent)
Amidotrizoate (contrast agent)
Meglumine iotroxate (contrast agent)
Radioactive iodine
Tincture of iodine
So-called nascent iodine
Iopanoic acid (contrast agent)
Amiodarone (30% iodine content)

References

External links
 

World Health Organization essential medicines
Wikipedia medicine articles ready to translate
Iodine